Walton is a civil parish in the metropolitan borough of the City of Wakefield, West Yorkshire, England.  The parish contains 20 listed buildings that are recorded in the National Heritage List for England.  Of these, two are listed at Grade II*, the middle of the three grades, and the others are at Grade II, the lowest grade.  The parish contains the village of Walton and the surrounding countryside.  The most important building in the parish is Walton Hall, a country house on an island in a lake, which is listed, together with a number of associated structures, including the iron footbridge leading to it.  The Barnsley Canal, no longer in use, passes through the parish, and three bridges crossing it are listed.  The other listed buildings are houses, farmhouses, and farm buildings.  The list also contains a listed farmhouse in the parish of Wintersett.


Key

Buildings

References

Citations

Sources

 

Lists of listed buildings in West Yorkshire